The Abbotsford Police Department is the police force for the City of Abbotsford, British Columbia, Canada. The force was established in 1955 as the Matsqui Police Department and was renamed the Abbotsford Police Department when Matsqui and Abbotsford amalgamated in 1995 to become the City of Abbotsford. The vision of the Abbotsford Police Department is to have the "Strength in Community". The mission of the Abbotsford Police Department is "make Abbotsford the safest city in BC".

The force is divided into six branches: patrol, criminal investigation, finance and budget, human resources, operations support, and support services. The chief constable is Mike Serr. The organization has 216 sworn officers, 84 civilians and over 100  volunteers, according to the police board and 2011 Abbotsford Police Department Compstat reports.

Members killed in the line of duty 
Since its founding in 1955, the APD has had two officers officer killed in the line of duty.

References

External links
 Abbotsford Police
 Abbotsford Police Foundation

Law enforcement agencies of British Columbia
Politics of Abbotsford, British Columbia
Government agencies established in 1955
1955 establishments in British Columbia